Rosa Galvez (born June 21, 1961) is a Canadian Senator from Quebec. At the time of her appointment, she was a professor at Laval University and head of the university's Department of Civil Engineering and Water Engineering. Her appointment to the Senate was announced on November 2, 2016.

Early life  
Rosa Galvez was born in Peru.

She is the oldest daughter of Elias Rogelio Galvez Rodriguez (a mathematician and professor at San Marcos University in Lima, Peru) and Juana Rosa Tantalean Angeles (accountant and teacher).

She first became interested in science when she chose to do a school assignment on pollution in Mexico City at age of 10. She enjoyed researching a topic that was not talked about at the time. Her interest led her to go beyond library research when she reached out to her town's municipality to learn about local waste management.

Education 
Galvez earned her Bachelor of Civil Engineering at the National University of Engineering in 1985. After immigrating to Canada, she earned both her Master of Science (M.Sc.), Environmental Engineering Technology in 1989 and then her Doctor of Philosophy (Ph.D.) in Geotechnical and Geoenvironmental Engineering in 1994 from McGill University.

Career 
Galvez worked briefly for the Ministry of Housing in Lima, Peru and received professional training at CEDAPAL (water works for Lima) and CEPIS (Centro Panamericano de Ingenieria Sanitaria, of the WHO), before moving to Canada in March 1986.

From September 1986 to June 1994 while doing her master and Ph.D. studies at McGill she worked as research assistant and later as Research Associate at the Geotechnical Research Centre, Civil Eng. Department.

In 1994, Galvez joined the Department of Civil and Water Engineering at Laval University and became head of the department in 2010. Her academic research has focused on the area of pollution. Her research achievements include advising on international issues such as the protection of the Great Lakes and the St. Lawrence River, studying the oil spill of Lac-Mégantic rail disaster, conducting studies for the Government of the Northwest Territories on mining and lands sustainability and discussed cumulative impacts of a British Columbia hydroelectric project on the Mackenzie watershed.

Research

Areas of expertise 
 Water
 Use of scrubbers for Wastewater treatment
 Environment
 Remediation of contaminated soil
 Depollution of urban lakes
 Environmental Impact Assessment
 Contaminant management in sediments
 Hazardous waste management
 Municipal solid waste management
 Management of contaminated sites
 Environmental Hydrogeology
 Environmental decision support methods
 Contaminant transport in the soil
 Use of scrubbers for wastewater treatment

Achievements 
One of Galvez's hallmark research achievements was the study of the catastrophic oil spill at Lac-Mégantic.

She advised the Commission for Environmental Cooperation on agreements between Canada and the United States and Quebec and Vermont on the protection of the Great Lakes and the St. Lawrence River.

Current research 

 Advanced study of unconventional oil behaviour, innovative emergency measures to surface water oil spills: protection of water sources, Partenariat, Conseil de recherches en sciences naturelles et génie Canada, Subventions de projets stratégiques (SPS), from September 30, 2016, to September 29, 2019.
 Centre de recherche sur l’eau (CentrEau), Subvention, Institutionnel - BDR, BDR - Centres de recherche reconnus, from May 1, 2017, to April 30, 2022.
 Effective implementation of sustainable remediation by the use of novel eco-processes and emerging genomic tools, Subvention, Conseil de recherches en sciences naturelles et génie Canada, Subventions à la découverte SD (individuelles et d'équipe), from April 1, 2017-04-01 to March 31, 2022.
 Institut Hydro-Québec en environnement, développement et société (IHQEDS), Subvention, Institutionnel - BDR, Instituts reconnus, from May 1, 2011, to April 30, 2019.
 Knowledge Network on Mining Encounters and Indigenous Sustainable Livelihoods: Cross-Perspectives from the Circumpolar North and Melanesia/Australia (MinErAL), Partenariat, Conseil de recherches en sciences humaines du Canada, Subvention de partenariat, from April 1, 2016, to March 31, 2022.
 Lac Mégantic : évaluation stratégique de l'urgence environnementale, outils intégrés d'évaluation des impacts cumulatifs, transformation et transport de contaminants, Partenariat, Conseil de recherches en sciences naturelles et génie Canada, Subventions de recherche et développement coopérative (RDC), du April 1, 2015 to March 31, 2018.
 Suivi environnemental de la mise en lumière du pont Jacques-Cartier, Subvention, Les ponts Jacques Cartier et Champlain incorporée, du 2016-12-19 au 2019-03-31
 Valorisation des plastiques de la collecte sélective en matériaux composites - Étude de cas chez Gaudreau Environnement Inc., Partenariat, Conseil de recherches en sciences naturelles et génie Canada, Subventions de recherche et développement coopérative (RDC), du 2015-01-01 au 2018-07-27

Publications 

Laadila, M. A., Hegde, K., Rouissi, T., Brar, S. K., Galvez, R., Sorelli, L., ... & Abokitse, K. (2017). Green synthesis of novel biocomposites from treated cellulosic fibers and recycled bio-plastic polylactic acid. Journal of Cleaner Production, 164, 575–586.
 Lassabatere, L., Spadini, L., Delolme, C., Galvez, R., & Winiarski, T. (2017, April). Modeling the effect of flow homogeneity on the fate of Cd, Pb and Zn in a calcareous soil. In EGU General Assembly Conference Abstracts (Vol. 19, p. 3171).
 de Santiago-Martín, A., Guesdon, G.A., Galvez, R., 2016. Plants for constructed wetlands as an ecological engineering alternative to road runoff desalination. Pages 233-266 dans Ansari, A.A., Singh Gill, S., Gill, R., Lanza, G.R., Newman, L. (Éditeurs). Phytoremediation - Management of Environmental Contaminants, Volume 4. DOI: 10.1007/978-3-319-41811-7_13.
 de Santiago-Martín, A., Michaux, A., Guesdon, G.A., Constantin, B., Despréaux, M., Galvez, R., 2016. Potential of anthracite, dolomite, limestone and pozzolan as reactive media for de-icing salt removal from road runoff. International Journal of Environmental Science and Technology, 13(10): 2313–2324. DOI: 10.1007/s13762-016-1085-1.
 Guesdon, G.A., de Santiago-Martín, A., Galvez, R., 2016. Phytodesalinization potential of Typhaangustifolia, Juncus maritimus, and Eleocharis palustris for removal of de-icing salts from runoff water. Environmental Science and Pollution Research, 23(19): 19634–19644. DOI: 10.1007/s11356-016-7176-1.
 Guesdon, G.A., de Santiago-Martín, A., Raymond, S., Messaoud, H., Michaux, A., Roy, S., Galvez, R., 2016. Impacts of salinity on Saint-Augustin Lake, Canada: Remediation measures at watershed scale. Water, 8(7): 285–304. DOI: 10.3390/w8070285.
 B. Morteau, G. Triffault-Bouchet, R. Galvez-Cloutier, and L. Martel (submitted) Constructed wetland treating de-icing salts contaminated road runoff with halophytic plants (Typha angustifolia, Salicornia europaea, and Atriplex patula), a pilot study. ASCE J. of Env. Eng.
 Galvez-Cloutier, Rosa; de Santiago-Martín, Ana; Guesdon, Gaëlle; Michaux, Arthur; Constantin, Boris (under revision) Comparison of anthracite coal, dolomite, urgonian limestone and pozzolan for removal of road runoff polluted water by deicing salts. Environmental Geochemistry and Health
 N. Kagambega, R. Galvez-Cloutier, A. Ouattara and M. Laflamme. 2014. Assessment of the Neutralizing Capacity of High Purity Dolomite on the Highly Polluted Acid Mine Drainage. International Journal of Environmental Engineering and Natural Resources. Volume 1, Number 3, 2014, pp. 120–129
 A., De Santiago Martín, B. Constantin, G. Guesdon, N. Kagambega, S. Raymond, R. Galvez-Cloutier. 2014. Bioavailability of engineered nanoparticles in soil systems. Journal of Hazardous, Toxic, and Radioactive Waste. Special Issue Nanomaterials: Measurements, fate and future. doi: 10.1061/(ASCE)HZ.2153-5515.0000263
 R. Galvez-Cloutier, G. Guesdon et A. Fonchain (2014) Lac-Mégantic : analyse de l'urgence environnementale, bilan et évaluation des impacts Rev. can. génie civ. 41: 531-539 (2014) dx.doi.org/10.1139/cjce-2014-0011.
 N. Kamal, R. Galvez and G. Buelna (2014) Application of a solid phase extraction-HPLC method to quantify phenolic compounds in woodwaste leachate. Water Quality Research Journal of Canada. 49.3 :210-222
 Alves, B., S. Dungan, C. R. S. de Carvalho Pinto, R. L. P. Carnin, and R. Galvez-Cloutier (2014) Metals in Waste Foundry Sands and an Evaluation of Their Leaching and Transport to Groundwater. Water Air Soil Pollution Journal (2014) 225:1963 DOI 10.1007/s11270-014-1963-4.
 Morteau, B., G. Triffault-Bouchet; R. Galvez-Cloutier and L. Martel (2014) Nutrient and removal kinetics impacts on salt phytoremediation by Atriplex patula and Typha angustifolia. ASCE Journal of Environmental Eng. DOI: 10.1061/ (ASCE) EE.1943-7870.0000889.
 Tornimbeni O., R. Galvez, G. Triffault-Bouchet, N. Dassylva and S. Roberge (2013) Study of heavy metal concentrations in Cipangopaludina chinensis and relationships with sediments in Saint Augustin Lake, Québec City, Canada. International Journal of Limnology. 49: 21–29. DOI 10.1051/limn/201334.
 S. Saminathan, Rosa Galvez-Cloutier, Kamal, N. (2013) Performance and Microbial Diversity of Aerated Tricling Biofilter for treating Cheese Industry Wastewater", Applied Biochemistry and Biotechnology J., 170, 149–163.
 R Galvez (2012) Two methods for the recovery of ecosystems affected by road runoff. In Drainage and stormwater management. Syntheses of best practices road salt management. Transportation Association of Canada: special issue on Synthesis of success in road salt management. 2-34.
 Rosa Galvez-Cloutier, S. Saminathan, C. Boillot, G. Triffaut-Bouchet, A. Bourget and G. Soumis-Dugas (2012) Testing Efficiency and Ecocompatibility of Various In-lake Restoration Techniques Env. Management J. Vol. 49, Issue 5 Page 1037-1053 DOI: 10.1007/s00267-012-9840-7.
 Morteau, B, Galvez, R., G. Triffault-Bouchet, S. Leroeuil, L. Martel and Y. Bédard. (2010)Treatment of salted road runoffs using Thypha latifolia, Spergularia Canadensis and Atriplex patula: a comparison of their salt removal potential. J. ASTM International. Vol 6, No 4. Doi: 10.1520/JAI102173 pp 218–227.
 Soumis-Dugas, Triffault-Bouchet, G, R. Galvez, G. and L. Martel. Ecotoxicological Assessment of an In-Lake Remediation Methods (2010) J. ASTM International. Vol 6, No 4. Doi:10.1520/JAI102181 pp 248–268.
 Ellwood NTW, Albertano, PA, Galvez, R., Mosello, R., Funiciello, R. (2009) Water chemistry and trophic status of Lake Albano (Central Italy): a 4-year water monitoring study. Journal of Limnology 68(2) 288–303.
 Galvez-Cloutier, R. and Sanchez, M. (2008) Quality Analysis of 154 lakes in Quebec, Canada: Trophic Status and Recommendations. Can. Water Res. J. Vol. 42.4: 252–268, 2008.
 Lassabatère, L., Winiarski, Galvez-Cloutier and Delolme (2007) Associated Zn/Cd and Pb retention induced by non -instantaneous dissolution of calcite deposit from an infiltration basin for the treatment of storm waters. Chemosphere 69 (2007) 1499–1508.

Awards 
 2018 'Meritorious Service Award for Professional Service', Engineers Canada
2015 Prix d’excellence en enseignement U. Laval (catégorie cours à distance, 10 Enseignants) Fondements du développement durable
 2014 Finalist ‘Femme d’affaires du Québec’, Quebec's business women network
 2013 ‘Excellence en Environnement’, Association Québécoise de Transport & Société d’assurance automobile-6ième Gala de Grands Prix d’Éxcellence en Transport. Quebec, Canada.
 2012 ‘Professionnel de l’année’, Chambre de Commerce LA, Montréal, Canada.
 2012 ‘Citoyen engagé’, Chambre de Commerce LA, Montréal, Canada.
 2010 ‘In recognition to international cooperation’ Université de Guanajuato, Mexique.
 2009 ‘Proud to be Peruvian’ Award to successful professionals around the world–Peruvian Congress, Peru.
 2008 ‘Immigrant notable’ 400e Anniversaire de la Ville de Québec, Canada
 2008 ‘Femmes en sciences’, 400e Anniversaire de la Ville de Québec, Canada
 2007 ‘Professeur Étoile’–Faculté de sciences et de génie. Université Laval, Canada
 2006 ‘Prix Fernand Seguin’ best scientific article, Réseau Environnement, Québec, Canada
 2004 ‘Excellence in Teaching and International Cooperation’ Guanajuato University, Mexico 2004 ‘Technical Editor Award’–ASTM International, USA.

Senate 
Galvez was nominated to the Senate on December 6, 2016, on the advice of Prime Minister Justin Trudeau.

References

External links

Rosa Galvez - Personal Website

1967 births
Living people
Canadian senators from Quebec
Independent Canadian senators
Women members of the Senate of Canada
Peruvian emigrants to Canada
21st-century Canadian women scientists
Academic staff of Université Laval
Canadian women engineers
21st-century Canadian politicians
21st-century Canadian women politicians
Independent Senators Group
21st-century women engineers